Pham Ngoc Thach University of Medicine is a public medical school in Ho Chi Minh City, Vietnam. It offers graduate and postgraduate education in medicine, health care staff training for the city.

It was officially recognized as a University on 7/1/2008. The approval decision was written by Prime Minister Nguyen Tan Dung.

Originated from a center for training and educating of healthcare staff in Ho Chi Minh City, Pham Ngoc Thanh University of Medicine was directed by the city council to operate as a university for the city. Unlike Ho Chi Minh City Medicine and Pharmacy University, it only allowed Ho Chi Minh citizens who had city hukous (household registers) to attend. However, in 2016, this requirement was removed and people from other provinces can attend.

School managing board
 Principal: Associate Professor Dr. Ngô Minh Xuân
 Vice Principal: Associate Professor Dr. Phạm Đăng Diệu
 Vice Principal: Associate Professor Dr. Nguyễn Thanh Hiệp

References

External links
Official website
Falcuty of Nursing and Medical Technology

Universities in Ho Chi Minh City
Medical schools in Vietnam
1989 establishments in Vietnam
Educational institutions established in 1989